Roginsky or Roginski is a Russian surname. It may refer to:

Arseny Roginsky (:ru:Рогинский, Арсений Борисович), Russian historian, Soviet dissident
Boris Roginsky (:ru:Рогинский, Борис Арсеньевич), Russian philosopher and writer 
Julie Roginsky, Russian-born American political strategist and commentator
Mikhail Roginsky, Russian painter

Russian-language surnames